The Stanford Compression Forum (SCF)
 is a partnership between academic and industrial leaders in the fields of Data compression . The Forum's mission is to facilitate research and collaborations, to expedite the transfer of academic research into technology, to supply academia with timely research problems, and to support learning and training in the field of compression.

References

External links
https://compression.stanford.edu

Data compression
Digital audio
Digital television
Film and video technology
Video compression
Videotelephony